Where to Look for Your Law is a bibliography of law. It is "well known". It has been described as "valuable", as "an indispensable tool" and as "an old friend". By 1990, it was "very outdated".

The First Edition was published in January 1908, the Second in October 1912, the Third in October 1926, the Fourth in October 1929, the Fifth in October 1935, the Sixth in October 1938, the Seventh in March 1943, the Second Impression of that Edition in May 1943, the Eighth Edition in February 1944, the Ninth in November 1946, the Tenth in January 1948, and the Fourteenth in 1962.

References

Further reading 
Ringrose, C W. Where to Look for Your Law. Tenth Edition. Sweet & Maxwell. 1948. Google Books.
Ringrose, C W. Where to Look for Your Law. Fourteenth Edition. Sweet & Maxwell. 1962.
Keeton, George Williams (editor). The Year Book of World Affairs. Volume 13. London Institute of World Affairs. Stevens. 1959. Page 356.
Briggs, Leyland Lawrence (editor). The Accountants Digest. Germain Publishing Company. 1957. Volume 23. Page 128. 
Chandler, George. How to Find Out: A Guide to Sources of Information for All, Arranged by the Dewey Decimal Classification. Pergammon Press. 1974. . Page 74.

Legal bibliographies
1908 non-fiction books